The 2020 WAFL season (officially the 2020 Optus WAFL Premiership Season) was the 136th season of the various incarnations of the West Australian Football League (WAFL). The season commenced on July 18th due to the COVID-19 pandemic, which forced West Coast into recess for this season.

Perth played in its first finals match since 1997, against West Perth at Arena Joondalup. Contrariwise, Peel, for over a decade and a half Perth’s perennial rivals for the wooden spoon, became the first team since 1999 to finish a Westar Rules/WAFL season without a win – indeed, before this COVID-19-shortened season, no WAFL team had managed only one win in a season since the Thunder in 2003.

Clubs

Fixtures

Round 1

Round 2

Round 3

Round 4

Round 5

Round 6

Round 7

Round 8

Round 9

Ladder

Finals

Semi-finals

Preliminary final

Grand Final

See also 
 List of WAFL premiers
 Australian rules football
 West Australian Football League
 Australian Football League
 2020 AFL season

References

External links
Official WAFL website

West Australian Football League seasons
WAFL